Roland Dorcely (born 1930) is a Haitian painter. Born in Port-au-Prince, Dorcely has exhibited his works in the United States, France, Canada, and Colombia. His works are displayed in Paris' Centre national des arts plastiques and in New York City's Museum of Modern Art.

References
 

1930 births
Haitian artists
Haitian painters
Haitian male painters
Living people